Minister for Finance is a position in the government of Western Australia, currently held by Ben Wyatt of the Labor Party. The position was first created in 1993, for the government of Richard Court. It was abolished in 1999, but revived in 2010 for the government of Colin Barnett. The minister is responsible for the state government's Department of Finance.

Titles
 16 February 1993 – present: Minister for Finance

List of ministers

See also
 Minister for Small Business (Western Australia)
 Treasurer of Western Australia

References
 David Black (2014), The Western Australian Parliamentary Handbook (Twenty-Third Edition). Perth [W.A.]: Parliament of Western Australia.

Finance
Minister for Finance